Marguerite Blanche was a Danish actress notable for her starring roles in British silent films. She was born in Copenhagen as Margaret Jessen, but emigrated to Britain where she made twelve films for director-producers such as Cecil Hepworth and Sidney Morgan. Her final film was Morgan's The Woman of the Iron Bracelets in 1920. Morgan then replaced her as the star of his films with his own daughter Joan Morgan.

Selected filmography
 Trelawny of the Wells (1916)
 A Place in the Sun (1916)
 The Grand Babylon Hotel (1916)
 The Grit of a Jew (1917)
 The Cobweb (1917)
 The Romance of Old Bill (1918)
 Sweet and Twenty (1919)
 The Black Sheep (1920)
 The Scarlet Wooing (1920)
 The Woman of the Iron Bracelets (1920)

References

Bibliography 
 Low, Rachael. The History of the British Film 1918-1929. George Allen & Unwin, 1971.

External links 
 

Year of birth unknown
Year of death unknown
British film actresses
Danish film actresses
Actresses from Copenhagen
Danish emigrants to the United Kingdom